Statistics of Belgian First Division in the 1974–75 season.

Overview

It was contested by 20 teams, and R.W.D. Molenbeek won the championship.
At the end of the season the division was reduced in size from 20 to 19 clubs, so three clubs were relegated with two clubs promoted from Division II to replace them.

League standings

Results

References

Belgian Pro League seasons
Belgian
1974–75 in Belgian football